Weiland is the fourth album by the German symphonic folk/doom metal band Empyrium. It is the second acoustic album released by the band, and the first to be completely sung in German language. All their previous albums only contained English lyrics, even though two songs on the album Where at Night the Wood Grouse Plays have German names, i.e. 'Abendrot' (English: Sunset glow) and 'Wehmut' (English: Melancholy), which are instrumental tracks.

The album is divided into three chapters (German: Kapitel): 1) Heidestimmung ("Heathland mood"), tracks 1—6; 2) Waldpoesie ("Forest Poetry"), track 7; and 3) Wassergeister ("Water Spirits"), tracks 8—12.

Track listing

Personnel
 Ulf Theodor Schwadorf - guitars, bass, mellotron, drums, vocals, producer, recording, mixing, mastering, design
 Thomas Helm - vocals, grand piano

Additional personnel
 Susanne Salomon - violin, viola
 Julia Hecht - cello
 Horst Faust - bassoon
 Nadine Mölter - flute
 Niklas Sundin - cover art
 Łukasz Jaszak - design

References

Empyrium albums
2002 albums